The 1974–75 Weber State Wildcats men's basketball team represented Weber State College during the 1974–75 NCAA Division I basketball season. Members of the Big Sky Conference, the Wildcats were led by fourth-year head coach Gene Visscher and played their home games on campus at Wildcat Gym in Ogden, Utah. They were 11–15 overall and 6–8 in conference play.

The last was a 26-point road loss to independent Utah State in Logan on Wednesday, 

In the remaining twelve games of the season under McCarthy, the Wildcats were  this included another loss to Utah State in the season finale, but only by two points in overtime at Ogden. The USU Aggies were invited to the 32-team NCAA Tournament, but were defeated in the first round by Big Sky champion Montana.

Junior forward Jimmie Watts was named to the all-conference team for a second time; junior center Al DeWitt and senior forward Brad Tauscheck were honorable mention.

References

External links
Sports Reference – Weber State Wildcats: 1974–75 basketball season
2015–16 Media Guide: 1974–75 season

Weber State Wildcats men's basketball seasons
Weber State